"I Remember You"  is a song by American heavy metal band Skid Row. It was released in November 1989 as the third single from their eponymous debut album. Composed as a power ballad, it was written by bandmates Rachel Bolan and Dave "the Snake" Sabo. It reached number six on the US Billboard Hot 100 and number 23 on the Mainstream Rock Tracks in early 1990. The song also charted at number two in New Zealand, number 12 in Ireland, number 14 in Canada, number 18 in Finland, and number 36 on the UK Singles Chart.

In 2003, Skid Row, this time featuring new lead singer Johnny Solinger, recorded a second version of the song entitled "I Remember You Two." The song appears in the album Thickskin.

Background
Bassist Rachel Bolan said, "'I Remember You' was just that one thing that kind of came out the way it did, and it was something that wasn't planned. It was a cool chord progression that Snake had, and I wrote some lyrics, and we worked on it."

Before releasing it on their debut album in 1989, Skid Row performed the song in numerous small clubs and bars, and the ballad was popular with women. However, Skid Row did not want to be known as a "chick band", and Bolan and guitarist Snake hesitated to include the song on the album. However, singer Sebastian Bach and the record label saw the potential in the song, and persuaded the addition of the track.

In a 2007 interview, vocalist Sebastian Bach commented, "'I Remember You' was the number-one prom song in the United States of America in the year 1990....You talk about making memories! Literally the whole country of America did their prom dance to 'I Remember You' one year, and that's a real heavy memory to beat."

Track listings
7-inch and cassette single
 "I Remember You" – 5:10
 "Makin' a Mess" – 3:38

UK 12-inch single and European maxi-CD single
A1. "I Remember You"
B1. "Makin' a Mess"
B2. "Big Guns" (live)

Charts

Weekly charts

Year-end charts

Certifications

Release history

In popular culture
The song also appears in the episode of South Park called "Guitar Queer-O," where Stan Marsh visits Kyle Broflovski after having a fight. 

The fictional group Queens of Dogtown covered the song in the fourth season of Californication.

The song appears in the film adaptation of Rock of Ages when Drew (Diego Boneta) and Sherrie (Julianne Hough) are in Tower Records at the beginning of the film.

References

1980s ballads
1989 singles
1989 songs
1990 singles
Atlantic Records singles
Glam metal ballads
Skid Row (American band) songs
Songs written by Dave Sabo
Songs written by Rachel Bolan